HMCS Eyebright was a  that served mainly with the Royal Canadian Navy during the Second World War in the Battle of the Atlantic. She was named after the medicinal flowering plant genus Euphrasia.

Background

Flower-class corvettes like Eyebright serving with the Royal Canadian Navy during the Second World War were different from earlier and more traditional sail-driven corvettes. The "corvette" designation was created by the French for classes of small warships; the Royal Navy borrowed the term for a period but discontinued its use in 1877. During the hurried preparations for war in the late 1930s, Winston Churchill reactivated the corvette class, needing a name for smaller ships used in an escort capacity, in this case based on a whaling ship design. The generic name "flower" was used to designate the class of these ships, which – in the Royal Navy – were named after flowering plants.

Construction
She was ordered for the Royal Navy (RN) as HMS Eyebright as part of the 1939-1940 Flower-class building program. She was laid down by Canadian Vickers Ltd. in Montreal, Quebec on 20 February 1940 and launched on 22 July 1940. Eyebright was commissioned into the RN on 26 November 1940 in Montreal. She was towed to Halifax and was finished enough to make an ocean crossing, which she did in January 1941 with HX 104. However she was not completed until 16 April 1941 after she had arrived at Sunderland in the United Kingdom. On 15 May 1941 Eyebright was one of ten corvettes loaned to Canada. She could be told apart from other Canadian Flowers by her lack of minesweeping gear and the siting of the after gun tub amidships.

Eyebright underwent two major refits during her career. Beginning in November 1941, Eyebright refitted in Charlottetown. The refit took two months to complete. The second refit took place in Baltimore, beginning in July 1943 and taking two months to complete.

War service

Royal Navy
After completing Eyebright was sent to work up at Tobermory, where the escort training facilities were located. Once those were finished she was assigned to the RN escort group EG-4 based in Iceland in May 1941.

Royal Canadian Navy

Eyebright was loaned to the Royal Canadian Navy in May 1941. Upon arrival, she was assigned to Newfoundland Command as an ocean escort. There she was placed in the escort group 18N and then beginning in October 1941, group N16. In December 1941 she left for a two-month refit returning in January to serve briefly with escort groups N14 and N13. Eyebright participated in the battle for convoy SC 44 in September 1941.  It was to be the only convoy she escorted to lose ships to submarine torpedoes.

Eyebright served with Mid-Ocean Escort Force (MOEF) groups C1, C3 and C4 from April 1942 through to November 1944. After returning from her second refit, Eyebright transferred to the Western Local Escort Force (WLEF) in November 1944 as part of escort group W-3. She stayed with that group until the end of the war with two exceptions, one trip with MOEF group C-5 and escorting the last HX convoy of the war to the United Kingdom.

Trans-Atlantic convoys escorted

Post-war service

On 17 July 1945 she was returned to the Royal Navy. Albert W. Vinke last appeared on Lloyd's Register in 1964–65. The ship was broken up by South African Metal & Machinery Pty Ltd in Cape Town in February 1965.

References

External links

Ships of the Royal Canadian Navy
Flower-class corvettes of the Royal Canadian Navy
Flower-class corvettes of the Royal Navy
1940 ships